Admiral Phillips Cosby (1729 – 10 January 1808) was a Royal Navy officer who fought in the American Revolutionary War.

Naval career
Cosby joined the Royal Navy as an ordinary seaman in 1747. He was given command of a schooner at the Siege of Louisbourg in 1758 and was present at the capture of Quebec in 1759.

Promoted to Post Captain in 1761, he commanded HMS Hind and HMS Isis. In 1766 he was appointed to HMS Montreal.

He was receiver general (treasurer) of the Caribbean island of Saint Kitts from 1771 to 1778, a lucrative post which he resigned on the outbreak of the Anglo-French War. In command of HMS Centaur in 1778, he took part in the Battle of Ushant and in command of HMS Robust in 1779, he took part in the Siege of Charleston in 1780. He also took part in the Battle of Cape Henry in 1781.

He was appointed Commander-in-Chief, Mediterranean Fleet in 1785, Commander-in-Chief at Cork in 1790, and Port Admiral at Plymouth in 1792.

Family
In 1792 he married Eliza Hurst, née Gunthorpe.

References

Sources

|-

1729 births
1808 deaths
Royal Navy vice admirals
Royal Navy personnel of the American Revolutionary War